The Junior women's race at the 2011 IAAF World Cross Country Championships was held at the Polideportivo Antonio Gil Hernández in Punta Umbría, Spain, on March 20, 2011.  Reports of the event were given for the IAAF.

Complete results for individuals, and for teams were published.

Race results

Junior women's race (6 km)

Individual

Teams

Note: Athletes in parentheses did not score for the team result.

Participation
According to an unofficial count, 92 athletes from 28 countries participated in the Junior women's race.  This is in agreement with the official numbers as published.

 (6)
 (1)
 (1)
 (1)
 (2)
 (6)
 (4)
 (6)
 (1)
 (1)
 (6)
 (1)
 (6)
 (1)
 (1)
 (6)
 (4)
 (1)
 (1)
 (1)
 (1)
 (6)
 (6)
 (1)
 (5)
 (4)
 (6)
 (6)

See also
 2011 IAAF World Cross Country Championships – Senior men's race
 2011 IAAF World Cross Country Championships – Junior men's race
 2011 IAAF World Cross Country Championships – Senior women's race

References

Junior women's race at the World Athletics Cross Country Championships
IAAF World Cross Country Championships
2011 in women's athletics
2011 in youth sport